Ole Forsing (born 23 July 1942) is a Danish former amateur football (soccer) player, who played for B 1903 in Denmark. He was the top goalscorer of the 1970 Danish football championship. He played five games and scored one goal for the Denmark national football team.

References

External links
Danish national team profile

1942 births
Living people
Danish men's footballers
Denmark international footballers
Association football forwards
Place of birth missing (living people)